The Eastern Trans-Fly (or Oriomo Plateau) languages are a small independent family of Papuan languages spoken in the Oriomo Plateau to the west of the Fly River in New Guinea.

Classification
The languages constituted a branch of Stephen Wurm's 1970 Trans-Fly proposal, which he later incorporated into his 1975 expansion of the Trans–New Guinea family as part of a Trans-Fly – Bulaka River branch. They are retained as a family but removed from Trans–New Guinea in the classifications of Malcolm Ross and Timothy Usher.

Wurm had concluded that some of his purported Trans-Fly languages were not in the Trans–New Guinea family but rather heavily influenced by Trans–New Guinea languages. Ross (2005) removed the bulk of the languages, including Eastern Trans-Fly, from Wurm's Trans–New Guinea.

Timothy Usher links the four languages, which he calls Oriomo Plateau, to the Pahoturi languages and the Tabo language in an expanded Eastern Trans-Fly family.

Languages
Meriam (within the national borders of Australia)
Bine
Wipi (Gidra)
Gizrra

Oriomo (Eastern Trans-Fly) languages and respective demographic information listed by Evans (2018) are provided below. Geographical coordinates are also provided for each dialect (which are named after villages).

{| 
|+ List of Oriomo (Eastern Trans-Fly) languages
! Language !! Location !! Population !! Alternate names !! Dialects
|-
| Gizrra || south Oriomo-Bituri Rural LLG, Western Province (Papua New Guinea) || 1,050 || Gizra || Western Gizra and Waidoro dialects
|-
| Bine || south Oriomo-Bituri Rural LLG, Western Province (Papua New Guinea) || 2,000 ||  || Kunini, Boze-Giringarede, Sogal, Masingle, Tate, Irupi-Drageli, and Sebe dialects
|-
| Wipi || east Oriomo-Bituri Rural LLG, Western Province (Papua New Guinea) || 3,500 || Wipim, Gidra, Oriomo, Jibu || Dorogori, Abam, Peawa, Ume, Kuru, Woigo, Wonie, Iamega, Gamaewe, Podari, Wipim, Kapal, Rual, Guiam, and Yuta dialects
|-
| Meryam Mir || Australia: Torres Strait Islands of Erub (Darnley Island), Ugar (Stephen Island), and Mer (Murray Island) || 700 || Meriam Mir || Erub (no longer used) and Mer dialects
|}

Pronouns

The pronouns Ross reconstructs for proto–Eastern Trans-Fly are,

{| class=wikitable
|-
| rowspan=2| I || rowspan=2| *ka || exclusive we || *ki
|-
| inclusive we || *mi
|-
| thou || *ma || you || *we
|-
| he/she/it || *tabV; *e || they || *tepi
|}

There is a possibility of a connection here to Trans–New Guinea. If the inclusive pronoun is historically a second-person form, then there would appear to be i-ablaut for the plural: *ka~ki, **ma~mi, **tapa~tapi. This is similar to the ablaut reconstructed for TNG (*na~ni, *ga~gi). Although the pronouns themselves are dissimilar, ablaut is not likely to be borrowed. On the other hand, there is some formal resemblance to Austronesian pronouns (*(a)ku I, *(ka)mu you, *kita we inc., *(ka)mi we exc., *ia he/she/it; some archeological, cultural and linguistic evidence of Austronesian contact and settlement in the area exists (David et al., 2011; McNiven  et al., 2011; McNiven et al., 2006; McNiven et al., 2004: 67-68; Mitchell 1995).

Vocabulary comparison
The following basic vocabulary words for Bine (Täti dialect), Bine (Sogal dialect), Gizra (Kupere dialect) and Wipi (Dorogori dialect) are from the Trans-New Guinea database. The equivalent words for Meriam Mir are also included.

{| class="wikitable sortable"
! gloss !! Bine (Täti dialect) !! Bine (Sogal dialect) !! Gizra (Kupere dialect) !! Wipi (Dorogori dialect) !! Meriam Mir
|-
! head
| mopo || mopo || siŋɨl || mopʰ || kìrìm
|-
! hair
| ede ŋæři || mopo ŋæři || eřŋen || mop ŋɨs || mus
|-
! ear
| tablam || tablamo || gublam || yəkəpya || girip, laip
|-
! eye
| iřeʔu || iřeku || ilkʰəp || yəř || erkep
|-
! nose
| keke || keke || siəkʰ || sok || pit
|-
! tooth
| giřiʔu ||  || ziřgup || || tìrìg
|-
! tongue
| wætæ || wærtæ || uːlitʰ || vlat || werut
|-
! leg
| er̃ŋe || er̃ŋe || wapʰər̃ || kwa || teter
|-
! louse
| ŋamwe || ŋamo || ŋəm || bɨnɨm || nem
|-
! dog
| dřego || dřeŋgo || ume || yɔŋg || omai
|-
! pig
| blomwe || blomo ||  || b'om || borom
|-
! bird
| eře || eře || pʰöyɑy || yi || ebur
|-
! egg
| ku || ku || uŕgup || kʰɨp || wer
|-
! blood
| uːdi || uːdi || əi || wɔːdž ||  mam
|-
! bone
| kaːke || kaːko || kʰus || kʰakʰ ||  lid
|-
! skin
| tæːpwe || tæːpo || sopʰai || gɨm || gegur
|-
! breast
| nono || ŋamo || ŋiam || ŋɔm || nano
|-
! tree
| uli || uli || nugup || wʉl || lu(g) 
|-
! man
| řoːřie || řoːřie || pʰam || r̃ɨga || kimiar
|-
! woman
| magebe || magobe || kʰoːl || kʰɔŋga || koskìr
|-
! sun
| abwedži || bimu || abɨs || lom || lìm 
|-
! moon
| mřeːpwe || mabye || mɛlpal || mobi || meb
|-
! water
| niːye || niːye || nai || ni || nì
|-
! fire
| ulobo || ulikobo || uːř || par̃a || ur
|-
! stone
| kula || kula || iŋlkʰup || gli || bakìr
|-
! name
| ŋi || ŋi || ŋi || niː || nei
|-
! eat
|  ||  || waː aloda || nina wavwin || ero
|-
! one
| neːteřa || yepæ || dər̃pʰan || yəpa || netat
|-
! two
| neneni || neneni || niːs || nɨmɔg || neis
|}

References

David, B., McNiven, I.J., Mitchell, R., Orr, M., Haberle, S., Brady, L. & Crouch, J. 2004. Badu 15 and the Papuan-Austronesian settlement of Torres Strait. Archeology in Oceania 39(2): 65-78.
Fleischmann, L. and Turpeinen, S. "A Dialect Survey of Eastern Trans-Fly Languages". In Reesink, G.P., Fleischmann, L., Turpeinen, S. and Lincoln, P.C. editors, Papers in New Guinea Linguistics No. 19. A-45:39-76. Pacific Linguistics, The Australian National University, 1976. 
McNiven, I.J., Dickinson, W.R., David, B., Weisler, M., Von Gnielinski, F., Carter, M., & Zoppi, U. 2006. Mask Cave: red-slipped pottery and the Australian-Papuan settlement of Zenadh Kes (Torres Strait). Archaeology in Oceania 41(2): 49-81.
McNiven, I.J., David, B., Richards, T., Aplin, K., Asmussen, B., Mialanes, J., Leavesley, M., Faulkner, P., UlmM, S. 2011 New directions in human colonisation of the Pacific: Lapita settlement of south coast New Guinea. Australian Archaeology 72:1-6.
Mitchell, R. 1995. Linguistic Archeology in Torres Strait. Unpublished MA thesis (James Cook University: Townsville).

External links
Eastern Trans-Fly languages database at TransNewGuinea.org

 
Trans-Fly languages
Languages of Western Province (Papua New Guinea)